Hypatopa nucella is a moth in the family Blastobasidae. It is found in the United States, including Colorado and Maine.

The wingspan is 16–18 mm. The forewings are yellowish brown, more or less suffused with purplish fuscous. The hindwings are pale brownish gray.

References

Moths described in 1907
Hypatopa